Format of entries is:
 ICAO - IATA - Airport Name - Airport Location

See also:
 AG - Solomon Islands

BG - Greenland 

Greenland is a self-governed territory of Denmark. Many locations in Greenland have Danish names in addition to the Greenlandic names. The Danish name, when applicable, is shown in parentheses.

BI - Iceland

BK - Kosovo

References 

 
  - includes IATA codes
 Aviation Safety Network - IATA and ICAO airport codes
 

B
Airport designator, ICAO:B
Airport designator, ICAO:B
Airport designator, ICAO:B